Pascal Thévenot (born 3 June 1966) is a French politician who was the Republican Member of Parliament for Yvelines's 2nd constituency from 2016 to 2017.

References 

1966 births
Living people
Deputies of the 14th National Assembly of the French Fifth Republic
21st-century French politicians
The Republicans (France) politicians
Politicians from Paris
Mayors of places in Île-de-France